Pinto or Santa Bárbara de Pinto is a town and municipality of the Magdalena Department in northern Colombia.

References

External links

 Santa Bárbara de Pinto official website
 Gobernación del Magdalena – Santa Bárbara de Pinto

Municipalities of Magdalena Department